Pär Hugo Gustav Lernström, born 4 September 1980, is a Swedish television presenter, perhaps best known for presenting the Swedish Idol series on TV4.

He has worked for SR Stockholm, Utbildningsradion, MTV:s morningshow "Mycket mer än müsli", Aftonbladet TV7 and Mix Megapol. Lernström has been TV-host for the Swedish version of Balls of Steel, (Ballar av stål).
In 2011 Lernström started to work for TV4. He was TV-host for Parlamentet in 2011. On 1 March 2011 it was reported that Lernström were going to be the TV-host for Swedish Idol 2011, replacing Peter Jihde. He is presenting Talang 2017 which is broadcast on TV4.

In March 2011, he and his wife Linda Öhrn appeared on the TV-show Herr och Fru on TV4. The couple's first child, a daughter, was born in August 2012.

Television Host 
2009-2010 - Ballar av stål (Balls of Steel)
2011 - Parlamentet (The Parliament)
2011 - Idol Sweden
2012 - Kockarnas kamp (Chef Struggle)
2013 - Veckans svensk (Swede of the week)

Radio Host 
2009-2011 - Afternoon with Pär on Mix Megapol (Eftermiddag med Pär på Mix Megapol)
2012- present - PP3 on Sveriges Radio P3

References 

Afternoon with Pär on Mix Megapol

Swedish television hosts
1980 births
Living people
Swedish radio personalities